Garcon Point is a peninsula located south of Milton and directly across Escambia Bay from Pensacola.

Roads 
There are two major roads that link Garcon Point with the surrounding cities. 
 Avalon Boulevard
 Garcon Point Road

Environment 
The area is mostly marsh and swamp and contains mostly pine trees. It also serves as an important watershed, filtering water for the surrounding bays and their ecosystems.

Wildlife 
Garcon Point contains at least 13 endangered and or threatened plant and animal species.

Some notable species are:
 the Pitcher plant Sarracenia leucophylla

Nature Trails 
There are some very notable nature and bike trails along the east coast of the peninsula. These trails, totaling 2.7 miles are maintained by the Florida Trail Association.

Demographics  
The demographics of the Garcon Point, Florida CDP is as follows:

Population: 457 (2020)
Population Growth: 31.7% since 2010-2020

Garcon Point is home to several additional census designated places.

References

Landforms of Santa Rosa County, Florida
Peninsulas of Florida